Classic Collection is the barbershop quartet that won the 1982 SPEBSQSA international competition. Members of the quartet are:  Curt Hutchison, tenor; Larry Wilson, lead; George Davidson, baritone and Terry Heltne, bass.

Discography
 A Barbershop Album vol. 1, cassette
 A Barbershop Album vol. 2, cassette
 Special Request, cassette
 The Classic Collection, cassette and CD
 Signature cassette, CD
 Masterwork Series, CD

References
 Discography and biography from Primarily A Cappella
 Discography from Mike Barkley's Monster list
 AIC entry (archived)

Barbershop quartets
Barbershop Harmony Society